Lac de Viry-Châtillon is a lake located in the municipalities of Viry-Châtillon and  Grigny in the Essonne department, France. The lake consists of five basins: étang des Nouées de Seine, étang de la Justice, étang de la Place Verte, étang de la Plaine Basse and étang de l'Arbalète.

External links
 

Viry Chatillon
Landforms of Essonne
Tourist attractions in Essonne